The EURO Journal on Computational Optimization (EJCO) is a peer-reviewed  academic journal that was established in 2012 and is now published by Elsevier. 
It is an official journal of the Association of European Operational Research Societies, promoting the use of computers for the solution of optimization problems. Coverage includes both methodological contributions and innovative applications, typically validated through convincing computational experiments.  

The editor-in-chief is 
 Immanuel Bomze.

Past Editor-in-Chief:
Martine Labbé (2012-2020).

Abstracting and indexing 
The journal is abstracted and indexed in the following databases:
 EBSCO Information Services
 Emerging Sources Citation Index
 Google Scholar
 International Abstracts in Operations Research
 Mathematical Reviews
 OCLC
 Research Papers in Economics
 Scopus
 Summon by ProQuest
 Zentralblatt Math

External links 
 

Operations research
English-language journals
Publications established in 2012